Daisy de Galard (4 November 1929 – 6 January 2007) was a French journalist and television producer.

Biography
After graduating from the École supérieure de journalisme de Paris, when it was uncommon for a female to be a journalist, De Galard was hired by Hélène Gordon-Lazareff to work for Elle magazine. She was the editor from 1972 to 1975.

De Galard also created the television show Dim Dam Dom.

She was a board member of National Commission for Communication and Liberties from 1986 to 1989 and then Conseil supérieur de l'audiovisuel  from 1989 to 1995. 

In 1978, De Galard was awarded the Legion of Honour.

References

1929 births
2007 deaths
École supérieure de journalisme de Paris alumni
French television producers
Elle (magazine) writers
French television presenters
People from Cher (department)
20th-century French journalists
Officiers of the Légion d'honneur